Auldbrass Partners is a private equity secondaries firm, founded by Howard Sanders, which spun-out from Citigroup in 2011. Auldbrass Partners has advised/managed over $1.2 billion of global investments in growth, buyout, growth equity, mezzanine and venture capital primarily in U.S. and European-based funds. Auldbrass Partners acquires secondary interests through both LP transactions and GP-led opportunities. Auldbrass Partners is headquartered in New York. Auldbrass is a 100% employee owned, Minority-owned Business Enterprise (MBE).

Investments 
Auldbrass Partners seeks concentrated positions in excellent companies with strong sustainable growth and resilience that can be reasonably expected to achieve liquidity in 3-5 years. Auldbrass Partners has a company focused, data driven approach which targets gross returns of 2.0x MOIC and 20%+ IRRs. Through both direct GP and intermediated relationships built over decades of successful investing, Auldbrass Partners has established a network of 200 funds and 300 general partner/limited partner relationships from which it sources its deals.[3] Auldbrass Partners team members have completed over $5 billion (500 fund transactions) of transactions.

Recent Events 
In April of 2019, Auldbrass Partners completed the final close for Secondary Opportunity Fund II at $185.6 million, which includes $92.9 million of co-investments.
Auldbrass Partners closed its Secondary Opportunity Fund I in December 2014; the Fund has not specified a target hard cap. The fund seeks to invest in private equity and hedge fund secondaries globally

References

See also
Auldbrass Partners Website

SecondaryLink Profile

Investment companies based in New York City